Quadrangularis means "quadrangular" (having four angles) in Latin.  Quadrangularis is the species name in the binomial nomenclature of several species:

Plantae 

 Cactus quadrangularis, the mistletoe cactus, a synonym name of Rhipsalis baccifera
 Cassia quadrangularis, the arsenic bush, a synonym name of Senna septemtrionalis (previously included in the genus Cassia)
 Cicendia, quadrangularis, a species of plants in the gentian family
 Corryocactus quadrangularis, s species of plants in the cactus family
 Critonia quadrangularis, a species of plants in the sunflower family
 Cissus quadrangularis, a species of the grape family
 Dorstenia quadrangularis, a synonym name of Dorstenia contrajerva, a species of the mulberry family
 Erithalis quadrangularis, a species of the family Rubiaceae
 Euphorbia quadrangularis, a succulent species of the spurge family
 Gladiolus quadrangularis, a species of the iris family
 Melicope quadrangularis, four angle melicope or four-angled pelea, a species of the citrus family
 , a species of the glory bush family
 Microstylis quadrangularis, a synonym name of Malaxis excavata, a species of orchid
 Montanoa quadrangularis, a species of the sunflower tribe
 Myrtus quadrangularis, a synonym name of Syzygium antisepticum
 Passiflora quadrangularis, giant granadilla, a species of the genus Passiflora
 Peperomia quadrangularis, a species of the pepper family
 Phyllostachys quadrangularis, squares-stemmed bamboo, a species of bamboo
 Rhigospira quadrangularis, the sole species of the genus Rhigospira, in the dogbane family
 Sauropus quadrangularis, a species of the family Phyllanthaceae
 Smilax quadrangularis, a synonym name of Smilax rotundifolia, roundleaf greenbrier
 , a species of the pipewort family
 Tarenna quadrangularis, a species of the family Rubiaceae
 Tillandsia quadrangularis, a synonym name of Tillandsia juncea, a species of the pineapple family
 Tithymalus quadrangularis, a synonym name of Euphorbia canariensis, Canary Island spurge

Animalia 

 , a species of water fleas, the type species of its genus
 Ancistrocrania quadrangularis, a species in the extinct genus Ancistrocrania of the lamp shell family
 Bagworm moth, species that build a box-shaped bag:
 Oiketicus quadrangularis
 Psyche quadrangularis, a moth of the family Psychidae
 Brasilodon quadrangularis, a species of the extinct genus Brasilodon
 Colochirus quadrangularis, thorny sea cucumber, a species of sea cucumber
 Crotalus triseriatus quadrangularis, a synonym name of Crotalus aquilus, a species of venomous pit vipers
 Dicyrtoma quadrangularis, a species of the globular springtails in the family Dicyrtomidae
 Funiculina quadrangularis, a species of sea pen
 Holothuria quadrangularis, a synonym name of Stichopus chloronotus, a species of sea cucumber
 Hoploscaphites quadrangularis, a species of the extinct ammonite genus Hoploscaphites
 Lepyronia quadrangularis, a species of spittle bug
 , a species of saltwater clams in the family Neilonellidae
 Orthonychia quadrangularis, a sea snail species of the extinct family Orthonychiidae
 Pseudotritonia quadrangularis, a species of the sea slug family Charcotiidae
 Styela quadrangularis, a synonym name of Polycarpa pomaria, a species of sea squirt
 Trigonia quadrangularis, a species in the extinct genus Trigonia of the saltwater clam family Trigoniidae
 Vermiculus spiratus var. quadrangularis, a synonym name of Vermicularia spirata, West Indian worm-shell sea snail

See also 
 Membrana quadrangularis, the scientific name of the quadrangular membrane, part of the human larynx
 Quadrangularis Reversum, a musical instrument built by Harry Partch

References 

Lists of species